Andrew Lawson (1800 – 28 February 1853) of Aldborough Lodge and Boroughbridge Hall, both in Yorkshire, and of 26 Pall Mall, London, was a British Conservative politician.

After unsuccessfully contesting the 1832 general election at Knaresborough, Lawson was elected Conservative Member of Parliament (MP) for the same constituency at the 1835 general election. He, however, lost the seat two years later, before regaining it in 1841 and holding it until 1847, when he was again defeated. Once more, he contested the seat at a by-election in 1851, but was unsuccessful.

References

External links
 

UK MPs 1835–1837
UK MPs 1841–1847
Conservative Party (UK) MPs for English constituencies
1800 births
1853 deaths